Fat suppression is a technique in MRI imaging where fat signals from adipose tissues are suppressed to better visualise uptake of contrast materials of bodily tissues, reduce chemical shift artifact, and to characterise the type of lesions such as adrenal gland tumors, bone marrow infiltration, fatty tumors, and steatosis by determining the fat content of the tissues. Fat suppression can be achieved by three techniques, namely fat saturation, inversion recovery, and opposed-phase imaging.

References

Magnetic resonance imaging
Nuclear magnetic resonance
Quantum mechanics